Airplay is how frequently a song is played on the radio.

Airplay may also refer to:
 AirPlay, a protocol developed by Apple Inc. that allows wireless streaming of media
 Airplay (band), a short-lived American band, formed by David Foster and Jay Graydon
 Airplay SDK, now Marmalade, a cross-platform game framework for mobile devices
 Airplay, a special edition of the Citroën C1
 Air Play, a jazz compilation album by Benny Goodman
 Play (airline), an Icelandic airline